{{Infobox diocese
|jurisdiction     = Diocese 
|name             = Acarigua–Araure 
|latin            = Dioecesis Acariguaruensi 
|image            = 
|caption          = 
|country          = 
|province         = Barquisimeto 
|rite             = Latin Rite
|established      = 27 December 2002 ( years ago)
|cathedral        = Catedral de Nuestra Señora de la Corteza 
|cocathedral      = 
|area_km2         = 5,510 
|population       = 550,000 
|population_as_of = 2005  
|catholics        = 485,000  
|catholics_percent= 88.2  
|pope             = 
|bishop           = Vacant
|coadjutor        = 
|auxiliary_bishops= 
|emeritus_bishops = 
|map              = 
|website          = 
}}

The Roman Catholic Diocese of Acarigua–Araure is a Latin suffragan diocese in the Ecclesiastical province of the Metropolitan of Barquisimeto in Venezuela.

Its cathedral episcopal see is Catedral de Nuestra Señora de la Corteza, in the city of Acarigua.

 History 
On 27 December 2002 Blessed John Paul II established as Diocese of Acarigua – Araure, on territory split off from the Roman Catholic Diocese of Guanare.

Episcopal ordinaries
 Joaquín José Morón Hidalgo (2002.12.27 – death 2013.10.30)
 Apostolic Administrator Ramón Antonio Linares Sandoval (2013.10.31 – 2015.08.10)
 Juan Carlos Bravo Salazar (2015.08.10 – 2021.11.16)

See also 
 Roman Catholicism in Venezuela

References

External links 
 GCatholic.org
 Catholic Hierarchy 

Roman Catholic dioceses in Venezuela
Roman Catholic Ecclesiastical Province of Barquisimeto
Christian organizations established in 2002
Roman Catholic dioceses and prelatures established in the 21st century
2002 establishments in Venezuela
Acarigua